The molecular formula C15H24N2O17P2 may refer to:

 Uridine diphosphate glucose
 Uridine diphosphate galactose

Molecular formulas